Yazid ibn al-Muhallab (672–720) was a provincial governor in the time of the Umayyad dynasty and an early member of the Muhallabid family that became important in early Abbasid times.

Life
In A.H. 78 (697-698 CE) al-Hajjaj ibn Yusuf, the Caliphate's viceroy of the eastern provinces, appointed Yazid's father al-Muhallab ibn Abi Sufra as governor of Khurasan. In A.H. 82 (701-702) al-Muhallab's son Mughira died and al-Muhallab sent Yazid to replace him. Soon afterwards al-Muhallab died and al-Hajjaj appointed Yazid governor of Khurasan.  There Yazid confronted external and internal enemies, including some rebels entering his province who were supporters of Abd al-Rahman ibn Muhammad ibn al-Ash'ath. Yazid defeated them. Yazid seized Nizak's fortress and made peace with him.

In A.H. 85 (704-705) al-Hajjaj replaced Yazid naming his younger brother al-Mufaddal governor of Khurasan.  Various reasons are suggested, including that al-Hajjaj encountered a prophecy that his successor would be named Yazid and al-Hajjaj considered this Yazid the only one threatening enough to worry about.  Al-Hajjaj imprisoned and tortured Yazid. In A.H. 90 (708-709) Yazid disguised escaped and made his way to Palestine where he was granted refuge by Sulayman ibn Abd al-Malik. Al-Hajjaj pressed Caliph al-Walid I who commanded his brother to send him Yazid in chains. Suleiman had his own son chained to Yazid approach the caliph and speak favouring Yazid's safety. Al-Walid accepted this and told al-Hajjaj to desist. Yazid returned to Sulayman and the two were very close to each other.

When Sulayman came to the throne in A.H. 96 (715), he appointed Yazid to govern Iraq. The next year Sulayman appointed Yazid governor of Khurasan. Yazid fought in Jurjan and Tabaristan, personally engaging in combat. In A.H. 99 (717-718) the new caliph Umar ibn Abd al-Aziz dismissed Yazid due to his tortures against people of conquered territories, especially Turks and Sogds. Yazid was captured on his way to Basra and brought before Umar who intensely disliked him. Umar imprisoned Yazid. In A.H. 101 (719-720) when Umar fell ill, Yazid escaped. Umar died.

Yazid approached Basra. Many joined him. He refused to swear allegiance to the new caliph, Yazid II. He attacked those holding his brothers, defeated them and freed his brothers. His son Khalid was arrested in Kufa and sent to Damascus where he remained in prison until he died. Yazid was advised to head east, but he declined to follow this advice. In A.H. 102 (720-721) Maslama ibn Abd al-Malik and al-Abbas ibn al-Walid led forces against him. On August 25, Maslama's troops advanced to battle, frightening some of Yazid's men who fled. Yazid had these beheaded. He then rode directly at Maslama. Maslama's cavalry intercepted him and cut him down.

Fighting continued. In Wasit, Yazid's son Mu'awiya on news of his father's death executed some prisoners, including Adi ibn Artat, the Basran governor who had sent Yazid to Umar in A.H. 99. Mu'awiya and other surviving members of the Yazid's family sailed to Bahrayn, then near Kirman. They advanced to Qandabil where they were denied entrance. There was a glorious fight in which all but two died, those two making their way to Zabulistan. Some captured boys were sent to Yazid II who beheaded them.

See also
 Farrukhan the Great
 Qutayba ibn Muslim
 Muhammad ibn Qasim

Notes

References

Bibliography
 
 

Muhallab
Muhallab
Umayyad governors of Khurasan
Umayyad governors of Iraq
Prisoners and detainees of the Umayyad Caliphate
Muhallabids
Medieval Arabs killed in battle
Rebellions against the Umayyad Caliphate
7th-century Arabs
8th-century Arabs